Nail Brewing is an Australian brewery and the producer of the world's most expensive beer, the Antarctic Nail Ale.

History
In 1996 John Stallwood registered the company, Nail Brewing Australia. On 23 March 2000 Norman Moore (Minister for Racing, Gaming and Liquor) officially opened Nail Brewing's first microbrewery at Bobby Dazzler's Ale House, (a pub in Murray Street, Perth), releasing Nail Ale, an Australian style Pale Ale. On 9 April 2004 Stallwood was assaulted after intervening in a fight in Fremantle, falling into a coma for ten days, Stallwood's head injuries resulted in a titanium plate being inserted in his skull. As a result, Nail Brewing operations stopped and the equipment was sold.

In 2006 Stallwood re-commenced brewing at Jarrah Jacks brewery in Pemberton. In December 2007 Nail Brewing relocated to Edith Cowan University's Joondalup campus. In late 2010 Nail Brewing produced the most expensive bottle of beer in the world, Antarctic Nail Ale, which was made with water melted from a block of Antarctic ice. The ice was collected by the crew of the Sea Shepherd by helicopter from an iceberg in the Southern Ocean, then flown to Tasmania, melted and transported to Perth. Only thirty bottles were produced, with the first bottle auctioned for A$800 on 3 November 2011, with a second selling, on 19 November 2011, for A$1,850 at a fund-raising event in Sydney.   All proceeds from the sales of the ale went to the Sea Shepherd Conservation Society. The previous record holder was The End of The World, produced by Scottish brewers, Brewdog in July 2010.

In January 2012 the Feral Brewing Company and Nail Brewing formed Brewcorp Pty Ltd developing a brewhouse and warehouse facilities in Bassendean.

Beers
 Nail Ale (4.7% alc/vol), an Australian pale ale, made with Tasmanian and German hops. First released in March 2000.
 Nail Golden (5.0% alc/vol), a Golden Ale.
 Nail Red (6.0% alc/vol), an American Red Ale.
 Nail Stout (5.2% alc/vol), an oatmeal stout. First released in June 2002.
 Clout Stout (10.8% alc/vol), a Russian Imperial Stout. First released in February 2008.
 Antarctic Nail Ale (4.6% alc/vol), an Australian Pale Ale. A limited-edition ale, made with water melted from a block of Antarctic ice.
 Nail Brown Dunn Brown (4.5% alc/vol), a limited release English Brown Ale
 Sledgehammer IPA (5.5% alc/vol), a limited release American Pale Ale

Awards
Nail Brewing has won a number of awards including:
From the Australian International Beer Awards:
 2002 – Nail Ale – Bronze medal
 2003 – Nail Stout – Silver medal – Small Brewery Draught Stout
 2006 – Nail Ale – Silver medal
 2006 – Nail Stout – Bronze medal
 2007 – Nail Ale – Silver medal
 2008 – Nail Ale – Bronze medal – Australian Style Pale Ale
 2008 – Nail Stout – Silver & Bronze medals – Stout Packaged & Stout Draught
 2009 – Nail Ale – Gold medal – Australian Style Pale Ale
 2009 – Nail Stout – Silver & Bronze medals – Stout Draught & Stout Packaged
 2010 – Nail Ale – Gold medal – Australian Style Pale Ale
 2010 – Nale Stout – Silver medal – Stout Draught
 2011 – Nale Ale – Gold medal – Australian Style Ale
 2011 – Nale Stout- Silver medal
 2011 – Clout Stout – Bronze medal
 2012 – Clout Stout – Gold medal – Stout Draught

From the Sydney Royal Beer Competition:
 2008 – Nail Stout – Gold medal & Best Stout
 2009 – Nail Ale – Bronze medal
 2009 – Nail Stout – Bronze medal
 2010 – Nail Stout – Silver medal
 2010 – Nail Ale – Bronze medal
 2011 – Nail Stout – Gold medal
 2012 – Nail Stout – Silver medal – Stouts & Porters
 2012 – Nail Ale – Silver medal – Pale/Golden Ales

From the Perth Royal Beer Show:
 2007 – Nail Ale – Silver medal
 2008 – Nail Ale – Best WA Beer & Silver medal
 2008 – Nail Stout – Best Stout Draught & Gold medal
 2009 – Nail Ale – Silver medal
 2009 – Nail Stout – Bronze medal
 2010 – Nail Ale – Silver medal
 2010 – Nail Stout – Gold medal
 2010 – Clout Stout – Silver medal
 2011 – Nail Stout – Gold medals – Best Stout Draught & Best Stout Packaged
 2011 – Clout Stout – Silver medal
 2012 – Nail Ale – Bronze medal – Australian style Pale Ale
 2012 – Clout Stout – Silver medal – Stout Imperial
 2012 – Nail Stout – Silver medal – Stout Other

See also 

 List of breweries in Australia

References

Notes

Bibliography

External links 
 

Australian beer brands
Australian companies established in 2000
Food and drink companies established in 2000
Bassendean, Western Australia
Beer brewing companies based in Western Australia